Aleph is the first letter of many Semitic abjads (alphabets).

Aleph may also refer to:

Science, technology and mathematics
ALEPH experiment (Apparatus for LEP Physics at CERN), detector of the Large Electron-Positron Collider
Aleph kernel, a computer operating system kernel
Aleph number, in mathematics set theory 
Aleph, an advanced system for inductive logic programming
Aleph (Automated Library Expandable Program), software by Ex Libris Group
Aleph (TeX), a TeX engine extension consolidating Unicode features from Omega and directional features from ε-TeX
Aleph (psychedelic), a psychoactive drug

Literature
 Aleph (novel), by Brazilian author Paulo Coelho
 The Aleph and Other Stories, short story collection by Argentine author Jorge Luis Borges
"The Aleph" (short story), title work of the collection
 Aleph, a character in the Warren Ellis comic series Global Frequency
 Aleph, a plot element in the novel Mona Lisa Overdrive by William Gibson
 Aleph, a shorthand designation for Codex Sinaiticus, a 4th-century manuscript of the Bible

Music
Aleph (band), a 1980s Italo disco band
 Aleph (pianist), stage name of Fady Abi Saad, born 1980)
 Aleph, a 2013 album by Gesaffelstein
 "The Aleph", a song on the album Saints by Destroy the Runner
 "Aleph", a song by Anahí

Organizations
 Aleph Institute, a Jewish humanitarian organization for both prisoners and military personnel
 ALEPH: Alliance for Jewish Renewal
 Aleph Zadik Aleph, international youth-led fraternal organization for Jewish teenagers
 Aleph Melbourne, an LGBT Jewish organization
 Aleph, the current name of the Japanese cult and terrorist group Aum Shinrikyo

People with the surname
 Patrick Aleph (born 1983), American writer and musician

Other
Aleph (film), a silent film by Wallace Berman
Aleph (journal), an academic journal on Jewish history and the history of science
 Aleph One game engine for the Marathon trilogy
 Aleph Sailing Team, a French America's Cup syndicate
 Mount Aleph, a location in the video game Golden Sun
 Aleph, the protagonist of the video game Shin Megami Tensei II

See also
Alef (disambiguation)